Niccolò Tucci (May 1, 1908 – December 10, 1999) was a short story writer and novelist who wrote in English and Italian.

Early life and family
Tucci was born in Lugano, Switzerland, on 1 May 1908, to a Russian mother and an Italian father who became a Swiss citizen. Niccolò Tucci grew up in privileged circumstances that were eliminated by the Bolshevik Revolution. His family relocated to Tuscany.

His daughter, Maria Tucci, is an actress who married her father's former editor, Robert Gottlieb.

Career
In 1938, he resigned a position with Mussolini's Press Ministry and immigrated to the United States. He wrote numerous short stories and a few longer works, many of which are largely autobiographical in their subject matter.

Death
Tucci died on 10 December 1999.

Selected publications
The Rain Came Last & Other Stories
Terror and Grief
The Beautiful Blue Horse
Military Intelligence
Before My Time. Jonathan Cape, London, 1963.
Unfinished Funeral

External links
 About the Author at Wendy's Poetry
 Memories of the Good Life at The New York Times

1908 births
1999 deaths
American short story writers
People from Lugano
Swiss emigrants to Italy
Italian emigrants to the United States